Horologium Sapientiae was written by the German Dominican Henry Suso between 1328 and 1330. The book belongs to the tradition of Rhineland mystics and German mysticism. It was quickly translated into a range of European languages and (alongside Pseudo Bonaventure's Meditations on the Life of Christ and Ludolph of Saxony's Life of Christ) it was one of the three most popular European devotional texts of the fourteenth and fifteenth centuries.

Editions and Texts
The book was translated into Middle English as The Seven Points of True Love and Everlasting Wisdom; a translation into modern English renders the Latin title "Clock of Wisdom" as Wisdom's Watch on the Hours. It circulated widely in vernacular languages such as English, French, Dutch, and Italian as well as surviving in more than 233 medieval Latin manuscripts.

Contents
The Horologium is divided into two books. Book 1 contains 16 chapters and focuses on considerations around Christ's passion whilst book 2 contains 8 chapters.

Chp 1 How souls are drawn to God
Chp 2 How the passion of Christ is a prelude to the knowledge of God
Chp 3 Christ's sufferings and how they were necessary
Chp 4 How the soul finds Christ through penance
Chp 5 A lamentation over the loss of fervour
Chp 6 The divine spouse is eternal wisdom
Chp 7 Divine wisdom is both lovable and terrible
Chp 8 Divine visitations come and go, and how the soul should respond
Chp 9 Why divine wisdom allows people to suffer
Chp 10 Of the torments of hell
Chp 11 Of the joys of heaven
Chp 12 Dealing with objections
Chp 13 How it is profitable to suffer tribulations
Chp 14 How profitable it is to consider Christ's passion
Chp 15 How a true disciple should conform himself to the passion
Chp 16 A commendation of the Virgin Mary

Book 2 includes a focus upon Eucharistic theology.

Influences
Henry Suso was a follower of Meister Eckhart and, controversially, defended his writings after his condemnation. The book follows the style of Boethius's Consolation of Philosophy, recording both Suso's frustrations and disappointments as well as spiritualising ways of dealing with them.

In chapter 9 Suso records an imaginary conversation with God in which he makes a comment about it not being surprising that God has so few friends when religious people encounter so many difficulties. This comment may have influenced traditions which claimed that Teresa of Avila made the quip "no wonder you have so few friends Lord, when you treat them so badly."

See also
 Christian mysticism
 Catholic spirituality

References

External links
Horologium Sapientiae (Latin Text)

14th-century Latin books
Books about spirituality
Christian devotional literature
Christian mysticism
Dominican spirituality
Literature of the Dominican Order